Jaboque is a wetland, part of the Wetlands of Bogotá, located in the locality Engativá, Bogotá, Colombia. The wetland is close to El Dorado International Airport in the Juan Amarillo River basin.

Etymology 
Jaboque in Muysccubun, the language of the indigenous Muisca who inhabited the Bogotá savanna before the Spanish conquest, means "land of abundance".

Flora and fauna

Birds 
Jaboque has 81 registered bird species, of which 4 endemic.

Endemic species unique for this wetland are:

Gallery

See also 

Biodiversity of Colombia, Bogotá savanna, Thomas van der Hammen Natural Reserve
Wetlands of Bogotá

References

Bibliography

External links 

  Fundación Humedales de Bogotá
  Conozca los 15 humedales de Bogotá - El Tiempo

Wetlands of Bogotá
Muysccubun